The Ganghwa massacre was a massacre conducted by the South Korean forces, South Korean Police forces and pro-South Korean militiamen, between 6 and 9 January 1951, of 212 to 1,300 unarmed civilians in the Ganghwa county of the Incheon metropolitan city in South Korea. The victims were collaborators with the Korean People's Army during North Korean rule. Before this massacre, 140 people were executed in Ganghwa as part of the Bodo League massacre in 1950.

In 2003, a history book describing the massacre was published by the Ganghwa Culture Center. On 26 February 2006, the National Archives of Korea admitted a 30 August 1951 official document in which then Attorney General Jo Jinman reported to then-Prime Minister Chang Myon about the massacre. On 17 July 2008, the South Korean governmental Truth and Reconciliation Commission acknowledged the civilian massacre.

See also
Third Battle of Seoul
Truth and Reconciliation Commission (South Korea)
Bodo League massacre
Jeju uprising
Mungyeong massacre
List of massacres in South Korea

References

Massacres in South Korea
Political repression in South Korea
Events in Incheon
Military scandals
Mass murder in 1951
Political and cultural purges
South Korean war crimes
Massacres committed by South Korea
War crimes in South Korea
January 1951 events in Asia
1951 in South Korea
1951 murders in South Korea
Massacres in 1951
Anti-communism in South Korea